"I Wish You Roses" is a song by American singer Kali Uchis, and was produced by Dylan Wiggins and Josh Crocker. The song was released on January 19, 2023, through Geffen Records, with a music video released alongside. The song is the lead single off her third studio album, Red Moon in Venus (2023).

Background and composition 
On January 16, Kali Uchis announced a teaser video on social media featuring "a Jello-like cake with a white rose in the middle of it". According to Uchis, the song is about "being able to release people with love".

Music video 
The official music video was released on the same day as the song released, and was directed by Cho Gi-Seok. In the music video, Uchis recreated some "iconic" scenes from the late 1999 film American Beauty. Also, the Colombian-American singer can be seen covered in rose petals, as she sings.

Charts

Release history

References 

2023 singles
2023 songs
Kali Uchis songs
Geffen Records singles